Chreomisis is a genus of longhorn beetles of the subfamily Lamiinae. The  genus and its two species Chreomisis flava and  Chreomisis rufula were described by Stephan von Breuning in 1956.

References

Astathini